Oberhofen may refer to several places:

 Oberhofen, Aargau, Switzerland, a former municipality
 Oberhofen Castle, Bern, Switzerland
 Oberhöfen, part of the town of Warthausen, Baden-Württemberg, Germany

See also
 Oberhofen im Inntal, Innsbruck-Land, Austria, a municipality
 Oberhofen am Irrsee, Vöcklabruck, Upper Austria, a municipality
 Oberhofen am Thunersee, Bern, Switzerland, a municipality
 Oberhofen bei Kreuzlingen, Thurgau, Switzerland, a village and former municipality